Fiction is the eighth studio album by the Swedish melodic death metal band Dark Tranquillity. It was released by Napalm Records on 19 April 2007, and by Century Media in the UK on 23 April, and in the US on 24 April.

This is the last new material to feature Michael Nicklasson as their bassist before leaving in August 2008 and the last release to be recorded at Studio Fredman.

Background
This album marked a few returns of previous quirks the band had done in the past - the song "Inside the Particle Storm" marks the return of Sundin writing lyrics again since "Tongues" from The Mind's I, Mikael Stanne utilizes clean vocals in addition to his usual growled vocals on "Misery's Crown" since "In Sight" from 2009 reissue edition of Haven and a guest female vocalist on "The Mundane and the Magic" since "Undo Control" from Projector.

An expanded edition was released in North America on 27 May and was scheduled for Worldwide release on 23 June 2008, containing two bonus tracks previously released in Australia and Japan, two previously unreleased tracks and two tracks taken from the band's live performance in Summer Breeze festival in 2007. The expanded edition also contains a bonus DVD with live songs, behind the scene footage, Character's "The New Build" promo video, and the "Focus Shift" video clip. In addition, the expanded edition features an extended booklet layout, an alternative cover artwork, and includes also a free Dark Tranquillity patch.

Reception

The album was generally well-received, with the album being called "another worthwhile addition to Dark Tranquillity's impressive discography." It was also noted that the album was similar to Character, in terms of musical style.

Track listing

Expanded Edition DVD
The expanded version also contains a bonus DVD with over 45 minutes of live recordings and promo videos:

 "Focus Shift" (promo video)
 "Terminus (Where Death Is Most Alive)" (brick-movie)
 "Focus Shift" (rehearsal room video)
 "Blind At Heart" (live)
 "Final Resistance" (live)
 "Misery's Crown" (live)
 "Terminus (Where Death Is Most Alive)" (live)
 "The Lesser Faith" (live)
 "The New Build" (live)
 "The Endless Feed" (live)

Personnel

Dark Tranquillity
 Mikael Stanne − vocals
 Niklas Sundin − lead guitar
 Martin Henriksson − rhythm guitar
 Martin Brändström − keyboards, electronics
 Michael Nicklasson − bass
 Anders Jivarp − drums

Other credits
 Nell Sigland − additional vocals on "The Mundane and the Magic"
 Album artwork and design by Cabin Fever Media

Charts

References

External links 
 Fiction at Century Media Records

2007 albums
Dark Tranquillity albums
Century Media Records albums
Napalm Records albums
Albums produced by Tue Madsen
Albums recorded at Studio Fredman